Ali Sait Çetinoğlu is a Turkish scholar, Professor of the Free University Ankara Independent Initiative, Turkey He was one of the first representatives and coordinators for Turkey at the Amnesty International. His interests include The Young Turks and Kemalism, the Armenian genocide and following actions that targeted 'Other' in Turkey: the anti-Jewish pogroms in Thrace in 1934, the intimidation campaign “Citizen, speak Turkish!” and the mobilisation of work battalions for the 'minorities' during 1941-42. Cetinoglu has published original articles based on research of the National Archives in Turkey.

Çetinoğlu is an author of The Malta Documents and Economic and Cultural Genocide, 1942-1944 books, published by Belge Press in Istanbul), The List of Murderers of Zaven Patriarch: the Biographies of Genocide Perpetrators (Peri Publishing House), From Ittihatism to Kemalism: Minorities in Turkey co-authored with Fikret Başkaya (Ozgur University). He is also a co-author of the Dictionary of Concepts and the Official Ideology dictionary published by Ozgur University. He worked in the field of human rights at the Ozgur Universite, Association of Protection of Human Rights and Amnesty International. He is an organising member of the Ankara Freedom of Thought Initiative that hosted the “1915 Within Its Pre-and Post-Historical Periods: Denial and Confrontation” conference in Ankara on April 24, 2010. He is the founder of the Free University system of Turkey, which publishes brochures presenting the Turkish history.
                     
On April 24, 2013 Çetinoğlu among with 9 other Turkish intellectuals visited the Armenian Genocide Memorial to pay tribute to the memory of the innocent victims.

His articles are published in such journals and newspapers, as Le Monde, Agos, Birgün, Evrensel, Newroz and Radikal.

References

Links
 Turkish Intellectuals Who Have Recognized The Armenian Genocide: Sait Çetinoglu
Foundations of non-Muslim Communities: The Last Object of Confiscation ( by Sait Çetinoğlu)

Historians of Turkey
Living people
21st-century Turkish historians
Turkish human rights activists
Year of birth missing (living people)